Cedric Antonio Kyles (born April 24, 1964), better known by his stage name Cedric the Entertainer, is an American stand-up comedian and actor. He hosted BET's ComicView during the 1993–1994 season and Def Comedy Jam in 1995. He is best known for co-starring with Steve Harvey on The WB sitcom The Steve Harvey Show, as one of The Original Kings of Comedy, and for starring as Eddie Walker in Barbershop. He hosted the 12th season of the daytime version of Who Wants to Be a Millionaire in 2013–14 and starred in the TV Land original series The Soul Man, which aired from 2012 to 2016. He has also done voice work for Ice Age, the Madagascar film series, Charlotte's Web, Planes and Planes: Fire & Rescue. He currently stars on the CBS sitcom The Neighborhood. In 2019, he received a star on the Hollywood Walk of Fame.

Early life 
Cedric was born on April 24, 1964 in Caruthersville, Missouri, the son of Rosetta (née Boyce), a schoolteacher, and Kittrell Kyles, an employee of The Missouri Pacific Railroad. He has a younger sister, Sharita Kyles Wilson, a communications professor at Pepperdine University in Malibu, California.

Cedric was raised in Caruthersville, Missouri, but after junior high school he moved to Berkeley, Missouri, a northern suburb of St. Louis. He is a graduate of Berkeley High School.

He earned a degree in communications from Southeast Missouri State University.

Career 
In 1995, Cedric moved into acting, auditioning for and receiving his first-ever role as The Cowardly Lion in the 1995 Apollo Theater Revival of The Wiz. He expanded his career by playing Steve Harvey's friend Cedric Jackie Robinson on The Steve Harvey Show. He then began appearing in films, including Barbershop, Barbershop 2: Back in Business, Ride, Serving Sara, Johnson Family Vacation, Intolerable Cruelty, Man of the House, Lemony Snicket's A Series of Unfortunate Events, Madagascar, Madagascar: Escape 2 Africa, Madagascar 3: Europe's Most Wanted and Be Cool. He was the subject of controversy when his Barbershop character made unpopular remarks about Martin Luther King Jr. and Rosa Parks. These comments were spoken in character, as part of the script; he has never apologized for them. In Madagascar, he voiced Maurice the aye aye. In October 2005, he joined the Champ Car auto racing series as a part owner. He appeared in the movie Charlotte's Web as the voice of Golly the gander. 

While his acting career grew, Cedric continued to do stand-up and traveled the country as one of the Kings of Comedy headliners with Steve Harvey, D. L. Hughley and Bernie Mac. The act was later made into a Spike Lee film, The Original Kings of Comedy. Cedric had his own sketch comedy show, Cedric the Entertainer Presents, but after being renewed for a second season, it was canceled by Fox before the season began. He took time to write a book, Grown-A$$ Man. He then appeared in the 2003 video game Tiger Woods PGA Tour 2004. His most recent HBO Comedy Special was Cedric The Entertainer: Taking You Higher. (Two of the background dancers from the special were Kamilah Barrett and Sandra Colton, who were finalists in Fox's So You Think You Can Dance.) He also recorded comedic interludes on two multi-platinum selling albums, Nelly's Country Grammar (2000) and Jay-Z's The Black Album (2003).

In the 2007 comedy film Code Name: The Cleaner, Cedric plays Jake, a janitor with amnesia who may be a secret undercover government agent involved in an illegal arms conspiracy. He starred in the 2008 films Welcome Home Roscoe Jenkins and Street Kings.

Cedric appeared as the lead comedian at the White House Correspondents Dinner, but jokingly remarked that he was unprepared because he thought that he would follow a humorous speech by President George W. Bush. He instead followed First Lady Laura Bush, who called him "hilarious" and "probably the funniest person" she had ever met.

Cedric has won many awards, beginning with $500 in the Johnny Walker National Comedy Contest in 1990 and coming in first in the Miller Genuine Draft Comedy Contest in 1993. BET named him Richard Pryor Comic of the Year. He has also won four NAACP awards.

He was inducted to the St. Louis Walk of Fame on June 7, 2008. His star is at 6166 Delmar.

He was the special guest host for WWE Raw on September 21, 2009, in Little Rock, Arkansas. During the show, he participated in a wrestling match, defeating Chavo Guerrero Jr. by pinfall. The match also featured Santino Marella as a guest referee. Cedric also got help from an unknown wrestler dubbed The Sledge Hammer (played by Imani Lee) and Hornswoggle.

In March 2010, Cedric made his directorial debut with Dance Fu, produced and funded independently by his company Bird and a Bear Entertainment with producer Eric C. Rhone. It starred comedian Kel Mitchell. Cedric made a cameo appearance in the film as a homicide detective. It was released straight to DVD on October 4, 2011.

Cedric appeared in the Broadway revival of David Mamet's play American Buffalo.

In a June 21, 2011, interview, Cedric said his latest reality game show, It's Worth What?, would air on NBC on July 12, 2011, but the start date was delayed by one week to July 19. Starting in 2012, he played the main character in the TV Land original series The Soul Man, featuring Niecy Nash. The series ran for five seasons and ended in 2016.

Cedric was the host of the classic American TV show Who Wants to Be a Millionaire beginning with its 12th season in national syndication, which premiered on September 2, 2013. "With his deep roots as a legendary stand-up comedian and actor, Cedric will bring his fresh approach and unpredictable fun to the show", said Disney-ABC Domestic Television president Janice Marinelli. On April 30, 2014, Cedric announced that he was leaving Who Wants to Be a Millionaire after the 2013–14 season to focus on his busy schedule. Terry Crews took over as host on September 8, 2014.

Personal life 
Cedric is married to Lorna Wells. They have two children, Croix (born 2000) and Lucky Rose (born 2003). He also has a daughter, Tiara (born 1990), from a previous relationship. He continues his involvement with his high school by awarding a scholarship each year to a graduating senior through the Cedric the Entertainer Charitable Foundation, whose motto is "Reaching Out...Giving Back". Cedric majored in mass communication at Southeast Missouri State University and worked as a State Farm insurance claims adjuster and substitute high school teacher before becoming a full-time comedian. He is a member of Kappa Alpha Psi. In May 2015, he was awarded an honorary doctorate in fine arts and humanities by Lincoln University of Missouri (his parents' alma mater). In 2018, St. Louis honored him by renaming the street in front of the Kappa Alpha Psi Alumni House Cedric The Entertainer Way.

Filmography

References

External links 

 Official website
 
 Cedric the Entertainer interview  on the Tavis Smiley show
 Cedric the Entertainer profile on Living St. Louis.

1964 births
Living people
20th-century American comedians
21st-century American comedians
African-American game show hosts
African-American male actors
African-American male comedians
American male comedians
African-American stand-up comedians
American male film actors
American male television actors
American male voice actors
American stand-up comedians
Comedians from Missouri
IndyCar Series team owners
People from Caruthersville, Missouri
People from Jefferson City, Missouri
Southeast Missouri State University alumni
Who Wants to Be a Millionaire?